Al-Muhajirin ( al-muhājirīn, meaning "the emigrants) is a Syrian village located in Qalaat al-Madiq Subdistrict in Al-Suqaylabiyah District, Hama.  According to the Syria Central Bureau of Statistics (CBS), the village had a population of 158 in the 2004 census.

References 

Populated places in al-Suqaylabiyah District